Shiver is the second solo studio album by New Zealand singer Jenny Morris, released on 24 July 1989 by Warner Music Group. The album was produced by Andrew Farriss and was critically acclaimed to be Morris's "most successful – and best" album to date. Shiver debuted inside the top twenty on the Australian ARIA Albums Chart and was certified double platinum by ARIA. It yielded five singles: "Saved Me", "She Has to Be Loved", "Aotearoa", "Street of Love" and "Self Deceiver".

Shiver was commercially successful in Australia. In early August 1989, it debuted at number fifteen on the Australian ARIA Albums Chart. It went to peak at number five on its fifteenth week and stayed there for two consecutive weeks. The album spent a total of forty-one weeks in the top fifty, and fifty-seven weeks in the top one-hundred. The Australian Recording Industry Association awarded the album double platinum certification for shipping 140,000 copies and became the thirtiest highest selling album in Australia for 1989. It sold around 250,000 copies in Australia.

Jonathan Lewis of AllMusic stated that although Shiver was not a huge leap from her previous album, it showed that she was maturing as a songwriter. He ends the review stating "The most successful – and best – of Jenny Morris' albums." The album also features Morris's cover version of "(Beggar on The) Street of Love" by Australian musician Paul Kelly.

In 2019, the album was re-released on vinyl and as a 30th Anniversary Edition.

Track listing

Charts

Weekly charts

Year-end charts

Certifications

Release history

References

1989 albums
Jenny Morris (musician) albums
Warner Records albums